is a temple in Nara Prefecture, Japan, that was founded as a nunnery in the seventh century by Shōtoku Taishi. Located immediately to the northeast of Hōryū-ji, its statue of Miroku and Tenjukoku mandala are National Treasures.

History
Chūgūji was once the palace of Hashihito, mother of Shōtoku Taishi. After her death it was converted into a temple. It was restored and converted to a nunnery by the nun Shinnyo in the late Kamakura period. Originally standing three hundred metres to the east, it was moved to its present location in the Muromachi period. Chūgū-ji is one of three nunneries in Yamato whose chief priestesses were imperial princesses. The site of Chūgū-ji has been designated a Historic Site, and the Edo period Omotegomon has been registered as a cultural property.

Miroku Bosatsu

Formerly painted, it is finished in lacquer.

Tenjukoku Shūchō Mandala

The embroidery of heaven and eternal life, together with one hundred tortoises and accompanying text, was restored in the Edo period by combining the surviving fragments with parts of a Kamakura period replica.

See also
Hōryū-ji
Shōtoku Taishi
List of National Treasures of Japan (sculptures)
List of National Treasures of Japan (crafts: others)

References

External links

 Chūgūji homepage
 

Buddhist temples in Nara Prefecture
National Treasures of Japan
Asuka period
Historic Sites of Japan
Monzeki
Prince Shōtoku